Aphelia tshetverikovi is a species of moth of the family Tortricidae. It is found in Russia, where it has been recorded from the north-western Caucasus.

References

Moths described in 1963
Aphelia (moth)
Moths of Europe